Hygrophila, commonly known as swampweeds, is a genus of flowering plants in the acanthus family, Acanthaceae. There are about 80 to 100 species, of which many are aquatic plants. The genus is distributed across the tropical and subtropical world. It is one of only two genera in its family that contains aquatic plants, the other being Justicia. The genus is treated in the tribe Hygrophileae, which is noted as being in need of revision at the genus level, meaning the current taxonomic boundaries of Hygrophila are likely to change in the future.

Description
The leaves are either homomorphic, all with one form, or heteromorphic, with different forms on one plant. Homomorphic leaves are always simple and entire. Plants with heteromorphic leaves generally have pinnately divided basal leaves with either filiform (feather-like) or linear segments, and undivided leaves higher on the stem.

The flowers have white to purple corollas with either 5 equal lobes or 2 lips. A lipped corolla has an erect, concave upper lip with two lobes, and a lower lip with 3 lobes. The flower has four stamens. Two may be staminodal, lacking pollen. The individual filaments of the stamens are united into pairs by a membrane. There is an inconspicuous nectar disc. Each flower yields at least 6 seeds.

Ecology and uses
A number of species are cultivated for the aquarium trade, including H. difformis (water wisteria) and Hygrophila polysperma (Indian swampweed). Many members of the genus are troublesome weeds in irrigation and drainage ditches as well as rice fields. Several have become established outside of their native ranges, largely due to the aquarium trade, such as H. polysperma in the southern United States.

Gallery

References

External links

Hygrophila subordinate taxa. Tropicos.
Hygrophila. The Plant List.

 
Acanthaceae genera